Višňové is a market town in Znojmo District in the South Moravian Region of the Czech Republic. It has about 1,100 inhabitants.

Sights

Višňové is known for the Višňové Castle.

References

Populated places in Znojmo District
Market towns in the Czech Republic